Alfredo Trentalange (born 9 July 1957) is an Italian former professional football referee. He was a full international for FIFA from 1993 until 2003. Now, he is a referee observer in UEFA.

References

External links 
 
 

1957 births
Living people
Italian football referees
Sportspeople from Turin